Gary Chang is an American composer of scores for film and television. Working primarily in the action and thriller genres, he has composed the scores to over seventy films, including Under Siege, Sniper, and The Island of Dr. Moreau. He is also a long-time collaborator of directors John Frankenheimer and Craig R. Baxley.  For his work on Under Siege, he won a BMI Award.

Selected filmography

Film
 The Breakfast Club (1985)
 Firewalker (1986)
 52 Pick-Up (1986)
 Sticky Fingers (1988)
 Dead Bang (1989)
 A Shock to the System (1990)
 Miami Blues (1990)
 Death Warrant (1990)
 The Perfect Weapon (1991)
 Under Siege (1992)
 Sniper (1993)
 The Island of Dr. Moreau (1996)
 Bad Day on the Block (1996)
 Double Team (1997)
 A Soldier's Sweetheart (1998)
 Sniper 2 (2002)
 Left Behind: World at War (2005)

Television 
 Murder in New Hampshire: The Pamela Wojas Smart Story (1991)
 Eerie, Indiana (1991)
 Murder Live! (1997)
 Storm of the Century (1999)
 Rose Red (2002)
 Kingdom Hospital (2004)

References

External links 
 

American film score composers
American television composers
Living people
American male film score composers
Male television composers
Year of birth missing (living people)